Scotsguard is an unincorporated community within the Rural Municipality of Bone Creek No. 108, Saskatchewan, Canada. The community is located on Highway 13, also known as the historic Red Coat Trail, about 10 km northeast of the town of Shaunavon.

Demographics

Prior to December 31, 1953, Scotsguard was incorporated under village status, but was restructured as an unincorporated community under the jurisdiction of the Rural Municipality of Bone Creek No. 18 on that date. As of 2020, only two people live in Scotsguard. They acquired most the land as residents left and have worked to preserve the village as a museum.

See also

 List of communities in Saskatchewan
 Prohibition
 Rum runners

References

Bone Creek No. 108, Saskatchewan
Former villages in Saskatchewan
Unincorporated communities in Saskatchewan
Populated places established in 1910
Ghost towns in Saskatchewan
Division No. 4, Saskatchewan